Agwari is a village in Ahore tehsil of Jalore district of Rajasthan State in India. The village is situated 14 km east of the Ahore beside 2 km of NH 325. Jawai River separates Agwari and Kuada. The nearest Railway Station is Jalore and Falna. Gangavas is 4 km away. The PIN code is 307030.

References

Villages in Jalore district